Mountjoy United Football Club is a Junior football club playing in the Fermanagh & Western Division 1 in Northern Ireland. The club is based in Omagh, County Tyrone.

Intermediate Status
Mountjoy United played in the Northern Ireland Intermediate league until 2014 when they rejoined the Junior level Fermanagh and Western Football League.

Youth Football
Mountjoy United currently provide Youth Football at all ages from Under 7 mini soccer up to Under 17. Mountjoy United Juniors currently have teams playing in the Mid Ulster Youth Football League at Under 11 and Under 17, they also have teams playing in the Brendan Keogh Youth League at Under 11, Under 12, Under 13, Under 15 and Under 16.

External links
 nifootball.co.uk - (For fixtures, results and tables of all Northern Ireland amateur football leagues)

Association football clubs in Northern Ireland
Association football clubs in County Tyrone